Marianela is a Spanish novel written by Benito Pérez Galdós in 1878. Several secondary characters appear in the novella that would become protagonists in his later novel cycle, Novelas españolas contemporáneas (Contemporary Spanish Novels).

Plot 

The novel takes place in the fictional town of Socartes, Spain. The town's name refers to the philosopher Socrates, and his ideas about internal and external beauty.  It tells the story of Marianela (sometimes referred to as "Nela"), a poor orphan girl with an ugly face, and her love for Pablo, a blind boy, who also has romantic feelings towards Nela. Marianela frequently sings to Pablo, and he believes she is beautiful because of her voice and wild yet intelligible imagination.

Pablo's father asks a famous doctor, Teodoro Golfín, to examine Pablo to determine if his sight can be obtained. Pablo, full of hope at the prospect, promises Nela that he will marry her after the operation, if successful. He is convinced that Nela is beautiful, even when she tells him otherwise. In the meantime, Pablo's father plans for Pablo to marry his beautiful cousin, Florentina, but tells neither of them about it. Florentina comes to Socartes, and when Marianela first sees her, she mistakes her for the Virgin Mary because of her beauty. When Florentina is out walking with Pablo and Marianela, she expresses her pity for Nela because she is poor, abandoned and nobody loves her. She vows to take charge of Nela and clothe and educate her, and have Marianela live with her like a sister.

Pablo eventually gets the operation that gives him his sight. Before seeing Nela, he sees Florentina and assumes she was Nela but was corrected. He is completely entranced by Florentina's beauty and occasionally asks for Nela. Nela attempts suicide because she knows that now she is of no use, since Pablo has the ability to see and differentiate between beautiful and ugly, but she is saved by Dr. Golfín. He takes Nela to Pablo's villa and into Florentina's room (which used to be the room of the wife of Don Francisco) and takes care of her while she is hiding away from Pablo because of her looks. Then, due to Pablo's desire to see Florentina, Pablo finds his way to Florentina's room and serenades Florentina for all her beauty. He then has his attention drawn to Don Teodoro and Nela on the sofa and confuses her for "just a poor girl who Florentina took in from the street." Marianela then finally reveals herself and kisses Pablo's hand three times. Upon the third kiss, she dies of a broken heart and leaves Pablo distraught and shocked.

Characters 
 Marianela "(la) Nela" – A 16-year-old poor girl who looks like the age of 12 and has a passion for Pablo. She is not only his guide, but also his admirer.
 Pablo Penáguilas – A 20-year-old blind boy who has a passion for la Nela. Eventually regains his eyesight and because of her beauty, fancies his cousin Florentina instead, causing la Nela to die of a broken heart.
 Teodoro Golfín – The doctor who performs Pablo's eye surgery; he gives him his sight back.
 Carlos Golfín – Engineer of the mines where he lives.
 Francisco Penáguilas – Father of Pablo, cares for his son very much; he is also well respected and very rich.
 Manuel Penáguilas – The brother of Francisco and father of Florentina, the girl who marries Pablo.
 Florentina de Penáguilas – Pablo's cousin, who eventually marries him.
 Sra.
 Sr. Centeno – Nela's caretaker. He is the caretaker of all 60 mules for the mines.
 Celipín Centeno – The youngest of the Centeno children. Usually given money by Marianela. Wants to leave Socartes to get an education.
 Sofía de Golfín – Wife of Carlos.
 Maria Canela – Mother of Nela.

Subject 
The novella, in its scope of characters, is a study of the relations between pessimism, irrationalism, and fiction. These theories are embodied, respectively, in the novella’s characters: Teodoro Golfín, Pablo, and Nela. The story contrasts their psychological analysis with a detailed description of nature, as an examination of the complexity of the world and its beauty.

Film adaptations 
In 1940, 1955 and 1972, the novel was adapted into films. A Mexican TV series based on the novel was filmed in 1961. In 1988 there was a second Mexican adaptation of Marianela as soap opera Flor y Canela starring Edith Gonzalez (Florentina), Ernesto Laguardia (Pablo) and Daniela Leites (Marianela). There is also a teleteatro of Marianela starring Fernando Colunga as Pablo.

In 2018, Sri Lankan director Bennett Rathnayake directed the film Nela as an adaptation of the novel.

References

External links 

  

1878 novels
19th-century Spanish novels
Novels by Benito Pérez Galdós
Novels set in Spain
Novels about orphans
Spanish novels adapted into films
Novels about blindness